CCDC188 or coiled-coil domain containing protein is a protein that in humans is encoded by the CCDC188 gene.

Gene

Human CCDC188 gene spans 3715 nucleotides and is located on the minus strand of chromosome 22 at 22q11.21. It is a protein coding gene that encodes CCDC188 protein. The mRNA transcript consists of 9 different exons which are spliced to form the 6 distinct CCDC188 protein isoforms. Genetic neighbors of CCDC188 include ZDHHC8, SNORA77B, and RANBP1.

RNA expression

CCDC188 is expressed at low levels across all adult tissues with increased expression in the pituitary gland and testis. CCDC188 has decreased expression in G1 of the cell cycle.  Genes with similar mRNA expression in the hypothalamus, supraoptic nucleus, and dentate gyrus are shown in the table below.

The promoter region for CCDC188 contains highly conserved p53 and CREB-ATF4 binding sites. Chromatin-immunoprecipitation analysis confirms p53 binding to the promoter region of CCDC188. Significantly repressed CCDC188 mRNA expression is found in both testicular germ line tumors and lung squamous cell cancer.  Copy number variations of CCDC188 have also been identified in lung squamous cell tumors with 16 tumors having amplifications and 4 having homodeletions. Genes with significantly increased mRNA expression under CCDC188 amplification in lung squamous cell tumors are shown in the table below. 

Other predicted transcription factor binding sites for CCDC188 are shown in the figure to the right.

Transcript regulation
Predicted CCDC188 3'UTR stem loops are shown in the figure below.

Protein

CCDC188 protein is 402 amino acids long and is 4.3 kDa. The protein contains a leucine zipper and transmembrane domain. The presence of both a leucine zipper domain and transmembrane domain suggests that CCDC188 protein functions as a transcription factor that is tightly regulated and must be cleaved out of a membrane to be activated. The inactive form of the protein is predicted to be located in the endoplasmic reticulum with the N-terminus and basic leucine zipper oriented in the cytosol. Other membrane bound basic leucine zippers include ATF6 and OASIS. Known nuclear transportation routes for membrane bound transcription factors in the endoplasmic reticulum include ubiquitination and destruction of the ER lumen region and COPII vesicular transport to the Golgi for proteolytic cleavage by resident proteases.

Post-translational modifications

Two phosphate groups have been experimentally verified on serine residues 322 and 324 in B-cell leukemia.

Homology

CCDC188 is conserved throughout all mammals including monotremes, marsupials, and placentals

When CCDC188 first appeared approximately 180 million years ago in monotremes, it lacked a basic leucine zipper. Marsupials were the first mammals to evolve a CCDC188 basic leucine zipper domain. The rate of evolution of CCDC188 measured by sequence identity to humans shows that CCDC188 initially evolved quickly at a rate of 0.97 changes per 100 amino acids per million years. Beginning with the first placentals, CCDC188 evolution slowed to a rate of 0.45 changes per 100 amino acids per million years. One paralog for CCDC188 exists in humans known as CCDC188-like. This gene first appeared in marsupials.

Pathology

A nonsense mutation in the coding region of CCDC188 has been implicated in retinitis pigmentosa, a retinal degeneration process marked by uncontrolled death of rod cells. CCDC188 is also deleted in 22q11.2 deletion syndrome.

References